Zaslawskaye reservoir is a water reservoir in the . It is the second largest artificial lake in Belarus. It is located only 5 km from the northwestern edge of Minsk, and is often called the Minsk sea.

Description 
Zaslawskaye reservoir is the second largest artificial reservoir of Belarus, second in size to the largest Vileyka reservoir. It was created in 1956 by a dam on a Svislach river in order to control floods in Minsk and to regulate the flow of the river. It is part of the Vileyka-Minsk water system. The bowl of the reservoir was a swampy floodplain of the Svisloch, Vyacha, Ratomka and Chernyavka rivers before flooding. It is located just 5 km from Minsk, and is often called the Minsk sea.

Gallery

References

External links 

Reservoirs in Europe
Lakes of Belarus